Clouds Rolling By is the third album by the Norwegian rock band BigBang, which was released in 2000. It was released on both CD and LP, the LP version being limited to 500 copies.

The album's producers were Michael Ilbert and Nils B. Kvam.

"Across the Street" LP version is an extended retake of the "Across The Street (Demo '99)" released in the 2000 Girl in Oslo SP (domestic edition).

Track listing 
 "To the Mountains" – 4:23
 "Girl in Oslo" – 4:23
 "Sing and Dance" – 4:04
 "Street Parade" – 2:52
 "Right Beside You" – 3:33
 "Telepathic Interview" – 2:49
 "Better Than Before" – 4:46
 "Summer Rain" – 3:23
 "Come Alive" – 3:49
 "Clouds Rolling By" – 5:24
 "Across the Street" – 4:57

Personnel 
 Øystein Greni - Lead vocals, guitars, piano, percussion and drums.
 Nikolai Eilertsen - Bass, baritone, guitar, piano, glockenspiel and vocals.
 Karim Sayed - drums, percussion and vocals
 Olaf Olsen - drums on #2, #6, #7 and #11, Percussion on #8.

References 

2000 albums
Bigbang (Norwegian band) albums